Kenostrychus is a monospecific genus of polychaete worms known from exceptional 3D fossils from the Silurian aged Herefordshire lagerstatte of England.

References

Protostome enigmatic taxa
†Kenostrychus
Prehistoric annelid genera
Polychaete genera